Edison Carlos Felícissimo Polidório (born October 30, 1979 in Paraíba do Sul), known as Edinho, is a Brazilian footballer who plays as left back. His last club was Maringá.

Career statistics

Honours

Club
Vasco
Campeonato Carioca: 2003

References

External links

1979 births
Living people
Brazilian footballers
Association football defenders
CR Vasco da Gama players